Trisetaria aurea, the golden oatgrass, is a species of annual grass in the family Poaceae (true grasses). It is native to the Balearic Islands, Italy (including Sicily), Malta, the former Yugoslavia, Albania, Greece, and Turkey (including the European portion), and has been introduced to the US state of New Jersey.

References 

Pooideae
Flora of the Balearic Islands
Flora of Italy
Flora of Sicily
Flora of Yugoslavia
Flora of Albania
Flora of Greece
Flora of Turkey
Flora of European Turkey
Plants described in 1975